Thomas Veitch (16 October 1949 – 16 October 1987) was a Scottish professional footballer who played as a midfielder. Active in Scotland, England and the United States, Veitch made over 250 career league appearances.

Career
Born in Edinburgh, Veitch began his career with Bonnyrigg Rose Athletic, turning professional with Heart of Midlothian in 1968. Veitch also played in Scotland for Greenock Morton, Airdrieonians and Queen of the South, in England for Tranmere Rovers, Halifax Town and Hartlepool United, and in the United States for the Denver Dynamos, before retiring from professional football in 1981.

Later life and death
Veitch died on 16 October 1987, his 38th birthday.

References

1949 births
1987 deaths
Scottish footballers
Bonnyrigg Rose Athletic F.C. players
Heart of Midlothian F.C. players
Tranmere Rovers F.C. players
Denver Dynamos players
Halifax Town A.F.C. players
Hartlepool United F.C. players
Greenock Morton F.C. players
Airdrieonians F.C. (1878) players
Queen of the South F.C. players
Scottish Football League players
English Football League players
North American Soccer League (1968–1984) players
Footballers from Edinburgh
Association football midfielders
Scottish expatriate sportspeople in the United States
Expatriate soccer players in the United States
Scottish expatriate footballers